Neil Broad (born 20 November 1966) is a former professional tennis player who represented Great Britain for most of his playing career. He is a former UK number 1 who won seven ATP tour doubles titles in his career, and won the silver medal in doubles at the 1996 Summer Olympics.

Playing career overview
The right-hander played primarily doubles in his career.  He achieved his highest doubles ranking of No. 9 on 9 April 1990.  Broad achieved his best Grand Slam doubles result at the 1990 Australian Open, reaching the semifinals while partnering Gary Muller of South Africa.  Broad played on the Great Britain Davis Cup team from 1992 to 2000, achieving a doubles record of 4–7.  He won a silver medal for Great Britain at the Atlanta Olympics in 1996, partnering Tim Henman. He retired from the tour in 2000.

Broad teamed up with Roger Federer in the men's doubles at the Australian Open in 2000. However they were knocked out by David Macpherson and Peter Nyborg.

Major finals

Olympic finals

Doubles: 1 (0–1)

Career finals

Doubles (7 titles, 17 runners-up)

After the tour
Since retirement, Broad has helped coach South African Paralympic tennis player Tim Hubbard in preparation for the 2004 Paralympic Games. Broad is currently coaching Brad Williams, a player at Texas A&M University. Broad also plays tennis on the Senior tour. He is also coaching a very promising young player, Chloe Heerden.

References

External links
 
 
 

1966 births
Living people
British male tennis players
British tennis coaches
Citizens of the United Kingdom through descent
Olympic tennis players of Great Britain
Olympic silver medallists for Great Britain
Sportspeople from Cape Town
Alumni of Rondebosch Boys' High School
South African emigrants to the United Kingdom
South African male tennis players
South African people of British descent
Tennis people from Greater London
Tennis players at the 1996 Summer Olympics
Olympic medalists in tennis
Medalists at the 1996 Summer Olympics
White South African people